Ennio: The Maestro (Italian: Ennio), also known as The Glance of Music, is a 2021 documentary film directed by Giuseppe Tornatore, celebrating the life and legacy of the Italian composer Ennio Morricone, who died on 6 July 2020, through interviews with directors, screenwriters, musicians, songwriters, critics and collaborators who have worked with him or who have enjoyed him throughout his long career.

Plot
 
Giuseppe Tornatore, Oscar-winning director, pays tribute to his friend and collaborator Ennio Morricone, retracing the life and works of the legendary composer, from his debut with Sergio Leone to the Oscar Award for The Hateful Eight in 2016. Interviews with renowned directors and musicians, the recordings of some of the maestro's acclaimed world tours, clips from some iconic films set to music by Morricone and exclusive footage of the scenes and places that defined his life.

Cast

Release

The film premiered on 10 September 2021 at the 78th Venice International Film Festival. It was released in Italian cinemas on 27 January 2022, and digital platforms on 22 April 2022.

Reception
On the review aggregator website Rotten Tomatoes, Ennio has a 100% approval rating, based on 23 reviews, with an average rating of 7.6/10. The website's consensus reads, "Attenzione! The man who came out of post-war Italy to revolutionize the Western, Maestro Ennio Morricone, is masterfully captured in a documentary befitting his genius."

References

External links
 
 

2021 films
2021 documentary films
Ennio Morricone
Italian documentary films
2020s Italian-language films
Films directed by Giuseppe Tornatore
Documentary films about music and musicians
Biographical documentary films
2020s Italian films